An orphan (from the ) is a child whose parents have died.

In common usage, only a child who has lost both parents due to death is called an orphan. When referring to animals, only the mother's condition is usually relevant (i.e. if the female parent has gone, the offspring is an orphan, regardless of the father's condition).

Definitions 

Various groups use different definitions to identify orphans. One legal definition used in the United States is a minor bereft through "death or disappearance of, abandonment or desertion by, or separation or loss from, both parents".

In the common use, an orphan does not have any surviving parent to care for them. However, the United Nations Children's Fund (UNICEF), Joint United Nations Programme on HIV and AIDS (UNAIDS), and other groups label any child who has lost one parent as an orphan. In this approach, a maternal orphan is a child whose mother has died, a paternal orphan is a child whose father has died, and a double orphan is a child/teen/infant who has lost both parents.  This contrasts with the older use of half-orphan to describe children who had lost only one parent.

Populations 

Orphans are relatively rare in developed countries, because most children can expect both of their parents to survive their childhood. Much higher numbers of orphans exist in war-torn nations such as Afghanistan.

 
 2001 figures from 2002 UNICEF/UNAIDS report
 China: A survey conducted by the Ministry of Civil Affairs in 2005 showed that China has about 573,000 orphans below 18 years old.
 Russia: According to Russian reports from 2002 cited in the New York Times, 650,000 children are housed in orphanages.  They are released at age 16, and 40% become homeless, while 30% become criminals or commit suicide.
 Latin America: Street children have a major presence in Latin America; some estimate that there are as many as 40 million street children in Latin America. Although not all street children are orphans, all street children work and many do not have significant family support.
 United States: About 2 million children in the United States (or about 2.7 percent of children) have a deceased mother or father. About 100,000 children have lost both parents.

Notable orphans

Famous orphans include world leaders such as Aaron Burr, Andrew Jackson, and Pedro II of Brazil; writers such as Edgar Allan Poe  and Leo Tolstoy; and athletes such as Aaron Hernandez. The American orphan Henry Darger portrayed the horrible conditions of his orphanage in his art work. Other notable orphans include entertainment greats such as Louis Armstrong, Marilyn Monroe, Babe Ruth, Ray Charles and Frances McDormand, and innumerable fictional characters in literature and comics.

History
Wars, epidemics (such as AIDS), pandemics, and poverty
have led to many children becoming orphans. The Second World War (1939-1945), with its massive numbers of deaths and vast population movements, left large numbers of orphans in many countries—with estimates for Europe ranging from 1,000,000 to 13,000,000. Judt (2006) estimates there were 9,000 orphaned children in Czechoslovakia, 60,000 in the Netherlands 300,000 in Poland and 200,000 in Yugoslavia, plus many more in the Soviet Union, Germany, Italy, China and elsewhere.

In literature

Orphaned characters are extremely common as literary protagonists, especially in children's and fantasy literature. The lack of parents leaves the characters to pursue more interesting and adventurous lives, by freeing them from familial obligations and controls, and depriving them of more prosaic lives.  It creates characters that are self-contained and introspective and who strive for affection. Orphans can metaphorically search for self-understanding through attempting to know their roots.  Parents can also be allies and sources of aid for children, and removing the parents makes the character's difficulties more severe.  Parents, furthermore, can be irrelevant to the theme a writer is trying to develop, and orphaning the character frees the writer from the necessity to depict such an irrelevant relationship; if one parent-child relationship is important, removing the other parent prevents complicating the necessary relationship.  All these characteristics make orphans attractive characters for authors.

Orphans are common in fairy tales, such as most variants of Cinderella.

A number of well-known authors have written books featuring orphans. Examples from classic literature include Charlotte Brontë's Jane Eyre, Charles Dickens's Oliver Twist, Mark Twain's Tom Sawyer and Huckleberry Finn , L. M. Montgomery's Anne of Green Gables, Thomas Hardy's Jude the Obscure, and J. R. R. Tolkien's  The Lord of the Rings. Among more recent authors, A. J. Cronin, Lemony Snicket, A. F. Coniglio, Roald Dahl and J. K. Rowling, as well as some less well-known authors of famous orphans like Little Orphan Annie have used orphans as major characters. One recurring storyline has been the relationship that the orphan can have with an adult from outside their immediate family as seen in Lyle Kessler's play Orphans.

Orphans are especially common as characters in comic books. Almost all the most popular heroes are orphans: Superman, Batman, Spider-Man, Robin, The Flash, Captain Marvel, Captain America, and Green Arrow were all orphaned. Orphans are also very common among villains: Bane, Catwoman, and Magneto are examples. Lex Luthor, Deadpool, and Carnage can also be included on this list, though they killed one or both of their parents. Supporting characters befriended by the heroes are also often orphans, including the Newsboy Legion and Rick Jones.

In religious texts

Many religious texts, including the Bible and the Quran, contain the idea that helping and defending orphans is a very important and God-pleasing matter. The religious leaders Moses and Muhammad were orphaned as children. Several scriptural citations describe how orphans should be treated:

Bible

 "Do not take advantage of a widow or an orphan." (Hebrew Bible, Exodus 22:22)
 "Be joyful at your festival—you, your sons and daughters, your male and female servants, and the Levites, the foreigners, the fatherless and the widows who live in your towns".(Hebrew Bible, Book of Deuteronomy 16:14)
 "Leave your orphans; I will protect their lives. Your widows too can trust in me." (Hebrew Bible, Jeremiah 49:11)
 "To judge the fatherless and the oppressed, that the man of the earth may no more oppress." (Hebrew Bible, Psalms 10:18)
"I will not leave you as orphans; I will come to you." (New Testament, John 14:18)
 "Religion that God our Father accepts as pure and faultless is this: to look after orphans and widows in their distress and to keep oneself from being polluted by the world." (New Testament, James 1:27)

Qu'ran

 "And they feed, for the love of God, the indigent, the orphan, and the captive," - (The Quran, The Human: 8)
 "Therefore, treat not the orphan with harshness," (The Quran, The Morning Hours: 9)
 "Have you not seen those who deny the faith and the Day of Judgment? Those are people who drive orphans away harshly, and do not encourage feeding the indigent. So woe be upon those who do prayer but are neglectful of it or show it off out of vanity, and those who deny even small kindnesses to others." - (The Quran, Small Kindnesses: 1-7)
 "(Be good to) orphans and the very poor. And speak good words to people." (The Quran, The Heifer: 83) 
 "…They will ask you about the property of orphans. Say, 'Managing it in their best interests is best'. If you mix your property with theirs, they are your brothers…" (The Quran, The Heifer: 220)
 "Give orphans their property, and do not substitute bad things for good. Do not assimilate their property into your own. Doing that is a serious crime." (The Quran, The Women: 2)
 "Keep a close check on orphans until they reach a marriageable age, then if you perceive that they have sound judgement hand over their property to them..." (The Quran, The Women: 6)

See also
 Adoption
 AIDS orphan
 Child abandonment
Foster
 Legitimacy (family law)
 Orphan Train
 Orphanage
 Street children
 Empower Orphans
 Euro-orphan

References

Bibliography
 Bullen, John. "Orphans, Idiots, Lunatics, and More Idiots: Recent Approaches to the History of Child Welfare in Canada," Histoire Sociale: Social History, May 1985, Vol. 18 Issue 35, pp 133–145
Harrington, Joel F. "The Unwanted Child: The Fate of Foundlings, Orphans and Juvenile Criminals in Early Modern Germany (2009)
 Keating, Janie. A Child for Keeps: The History of Adoption in England, 1918-45 (2009)
Miller, Timothy S. The Orphans of Byzantium: Child Welfare in the Christian Empire (2009)
 Safley, Thomas Max. Children of the Laboring Poor: Expectation and Experience Among the Orphans of Early Modern Augsburg (2006)
 Sen, Satadru. "The orphaned colony: Orphanage, child and authority in British India," Indian Economic and Social History Review, Oct-Dec 2007, Vol. 44 Issue 4, pp 463-488
 Terpstra, Nicholas. Abandoned Children of the Italian Renaissance: Orphan Care in Florence and Bologna (2005)

United States 
 Berebitsky, Julie. Like Our Very Own: Adoption and the Changing Culture of Motherhood, 1851-1950 (2000)
 Carp, E. Wayne, ed. Adoption in America: Historical Perspectives (2003)
 Hacsi, Timothy A. A Second Home: Orphan Asylums and Poor Families in America (1997)
 Herman, Ellen. "Kinship by Design: A History of Adoption in the Modern United States (2008) 
 Kleinberg, S. J. Widows And Orphans First: The Family Economy And Social Welfare Policy, 1880-1939 (2006)
 Miller, Julie. Abandoned: Foundlings in Nineteenth-Century New York City (2007)

External links 

Family
Child welfare
Human development
Effects of death on children
Adoption, fostering, orphan care and displacement